Great Is Thy Faithfulness is a popular Christian hymn written by Thomas Chisholm (1866–1960) with music composed by William M. Runyan (1870–1957) in Baldwin City, Kansas, U.S.

The phrase "great is thy faithfulness" comes from the Old Testament Book of Lamentations 3:23. These exact words occur in both the King James Bible and the Revised Standard Version.

History 
Thomas O. Chisholm wrote the poem in 1923 about God's faithfulness over his lifetime. Chisholm sent the song to William Runyan in Kansas, who was affiliated with both the Moody Bible Institute and Hope Publishing Company. Runyan set the poem to music, and it was published that same year by Hope Publishing Company and became popular among church groups. The Biblical lyrics reference Lamentations 3:22-23. The song was exposed to wide audiences after becoming popular with Dr. William Henry Houghton of the Moody Bible Institute and Billy Graham, who used the song frequently on his international crusades. Since the middle 20th century, this hymn has been the university hymn of Cairn University.

In 2019, the song entered the public domain in the United States.

References

External links
Lyrics on Hymnal.net

American Christian hymns
1923 songs
20th-century hymns
Public domain music